Ligueux is the name of several communes in France:

 Ligueux, Dordogne, in the Dordogne department
 Ligueux, Gironde, in the Gironde department